Paul Lafargue (born 8 July 1988) is a French racing driver currently competing in the European Le Mans Series LMP2 class for IDEC Sport. Lafargue won the 2019 European Le Mans Series championship driving for IDEC Sport. Lafargue has also competed in the International GT Open and the Le Mans Cup, as well as several classic car races.

Racing Record

Complete European Le Mans Series results 
(key) (Races in bold indicate pole position; results in italics indicate fastest lap)

Complete 24 Hours of Le Mans results

References

1988 births
Living people
French racing drivers
European Le Mans Series drivers
24 Hours of Le Mans drivers
24H Series drivers
Le Mans Cup drivers